Zhao Mausoleum may refer to:

Zhao Mausoleum (Tang dynasty), mausoleum of Chinese emperor Taizong of Tang, located at Jiuzong Mountain, Shaanxi, China
Six Steeds of Zhao Mausoleum
Zhao Mausoleum (Qing dynasty), mausoleum of the Qing emperor Huang Taji, located in Beiling Park, Shenyang, Liaoning, China